Let Freedom Swing is a big band jazz album recorded by the SWR Big Band with Toshiko Akiyoshi as guest pianist/conductor.  The album was released as a 2 disk CD in February 2008 by Hänssler Verlag in Germany and includes performances of 12 Akiyoshi compositions.

Track listing
All songs composed and arranged by Toshiko Akiyoshi:
 "Drum Conference" (3rd movement) – 13:28
 "Repose" – 5:16
 "Harlequin's Tear" – 7:16
 "Kogun" – 8:10
 "Feast in Milano" – 8:15
 "Let Freedom Swing" – 9:42
 "Lady Liberty" – 7:24
 "Pollination" – 13:08
 "I Know Who Loves You" – 5:48
 "Warning! Success May Be Hazardous to Your Health" – 5:48
 "Song For The Harvest" – 7:24
 "Epilogue: Hope" – 4:50
 "Harlequin's Tear" (live bonus track) – 7:35

Personnel
Toshiko Akiyoshi – piano
Decebal Badila – bass
Holger Nell – drums
Farouk Gomati – percussion
Klaus Graf – alto saxophone, flute, clarinet, soprano saxophone
Axel Kühn – alto saxophone, flute, soprano saxophone
Andreas Maile – tenor saxophone, flute, clarinet, soprano saxophone
Jörg Kaufmann – tenor saxophone, flute, piccolo flute
Pierre Paquette – baritone saxophone, bass clarinet
Karl Farrent – trumpet
Claus Reichstaller – trumpet
Frank Wellert – trumpet
Felice Civitareale – trumpet
Rudolf Reindl – trumpet
Marc Godfroid – trombone
Ian Cumming – trombone
Ernst Hutter – trombone
Georg Maus – trombone
Dagmar Claus – speaker (on track 6, Let Freedom Swing)

References / External Links
SWR Big Band home page
Hänssler Verlag
Hänssler CD 93.203

Toshiko Akiyoshi albums
2008 albums